Koruri is a feminine Japanese given name which is written in a variety of forms. It is synonymous with the word Coruri, which means Siberian blue robin (Luscinia cyane) in Japanese.

Possible writings

Koruri can be written using different kanji characters and can mean:

 小琉璃 "small, jewelry, crystal"
 小瑠凛 "small, lapis, gallant"
 小瑠璃 "small, lapis, crystal"
 心瑠璃 "heart, lapis, crystal"
 湖瑠璃 "lake, lapis, crystal"
 瑚瑠璃 "name of the ritual, lapis, crystal"
 瑚瑠里 "name of the ritual, lapis, earth"

Meaning
Used as a noun, Koruri is the Japanese word for the Siberian blue robin (Luscinia cyane). As a given name or proper noun, the first kanji stroke of koruri is ko. Sounds that start with ka are often used for those in relationships, or for actions such as winning, competing, overcoming, and cooperating. Sounds with vowels such as ko (o) express open-mindedness and give the impression of being cooperative and solid. This first kanji stroke can also mean small which gives the impression of cuteness. Next is the kanji character ru, which has the images of jewelry and gorgeous. The final kanji stroke used is ri, which means refined and beautiful.

Fictional characters

Koruri, a character in Tsubasa Reservoir Chronicle the Movie: The Princess in the Birdcage Kingdom.
, a character in 7 Seeds.
, a character in Girl Friend Beta.

References

External links
Baby naming guide

Japanese feminine given names